Site of the First CPC National Congress · Xintiandi is an interchange station between Shanghai Metro Lines 10 and 13, located in the Xintiandi shopping area of Huangpu District. Line 1o service commenced on 10 April 2010, while line 13 service commenced on 19 December 2015.

On 20 June 2021, to celebrate the 100th Anniversary of the Chinese Communist Party, the station name changed from Xintiandi Station to Site of the First CPC National Congress · Xintiandi Station.

Station Layout

References

Railway stations in Shanghai
Shanghai Metro stations in Huangpu District
Line 10, Shanghai Metro
Line 13, Shanghai Metro
Railway stations in China opened in 2010